Until Forever is the debut EP by rap/production duo MnkeyWrench. The EP was released as a free download on August 1, 2011. A digital copy of Until Forever is currently available for purchase on iTunes and Amazon.

Track listing

References

External links
Until Forever on iTunes
Until Forever on Amazon

2011 debut EPs
Hip hop albums by American artists